The 2014 Beijing Guoan F.C. season was their 11th consecutive season in the Chinese Super League, established in 2004. They competed in the AFC Champions League and Chinese FA Cup.

Players

First team squad

As of 27 July 2014

Reserve squad

Club

Coaching staff

Transfers

Winter

In:

 

 

 
 

 

Out:

Summer

In:

 

Out:

Friendlies

Pre-season

Competitions

Chinese Super League

Matches

Chinese FA Cup

AFC Champions League

Round 3

Group stage

References

Beijing Guoan F.C. seasons
Beijing Guoan F.C.